Hathras  Assembly constituency is  one of the 403 constituencies of the Uttar Pradesh Legislative Assembly,  India. It is a part of the Hathras district and one  of the five assembly constituencies in the Hathras Lok Sabha constituency. First election in this assembly constituency was held in 1952 after the "DPACO (1951)" (delimitation order) was passed in 1951. After the "Delimitation of Parliamentary and Assembly Constituencies Order" was passed in 2008, the constituency was assigned identification number 78.

Wards  / Areas
Extent  of Hathras Assembly constituency is Sasni Tehsil; KC Hathras, Hathras MB  & Mendu NP of Hathras Tehsil.

Members of the Legislative Assembly

Election results

2022

2012
16th Vidhan Sabha: 2012 General  Elections

See also
Hathras district
Hathras Lok Sabha constituency
Sixteenth Legislative Assembly of Uttar Pradesh
Uttar Pradesh Legislative Assembly

References

External links
 

Assembly constituencies of Uttar Pradesh
Hathras
Constituencies established in 1951